Magarao, officially the Municipality of Magarao, is a 3rd class municipality in the province of Camarines Sur, Philippines. According to the 2020 census, it has a population of 26,742 people.

Magarao is part of the Metro Naga Urban Area.

History

Magarao derived its name from a species of thorny wild bush locally known as garao-garao, which abundantly grows in the area. This type of plant no longer exists today as it was believed that the inhabitants of Magarao hindered its growth and propagation because of its thorny appearance.

It was a group of missionaries from the Order of Friars Minor who founded the town in 1570, although missionary work continued only in the year 1690.

How Magarao became a municipality

Magarao was first founded in 1570 and was named Garaoon from 1570 until 1800 when it was renamed Magarao. In 1802 the municipality was absorbed by Quipayo and was downgraded into a "visita. 

Calabangueños, Bomboneños, Magaraoeños fought for independence in 1897 until 1899 when the United States colonized the Philippines. Magarao was merged with Barangay Bombon in Calabanga and became a city in 1901 and was known as Magarao-Bombon shortly until 1903 when it was downgraded into a municipality. 

In 1949 Magarao Bombon ceased to exist as both municipalities separate.

Geography

Barangays
Magarao is politically subdivided into 15 barangays.

Climate

Demographics

Languages
Bicol is widely spoken in the town, while Tagalog, Hiligaynon, Bisaya, and Ilocano are used immigrants. Tagalog is being used by locals as lingua franca when communicating with non-Bicolanos.

Religion
Residents of Magarao are predominantly Roman Catholic.

Barangay Santa Lucia holds an annual novena to its patron saint, Lucy of Syracuse, nine days before her feast on 13 December. Villagers bring the saint's image in procession every morning of the novena at the poblacion, a celebration that attracts devotees from other parts of the Bicol Region. Hymns to the saint, known as the Gozos, as well as the Spanish version of the Ave Maria, are chanted during the dawn procession, which is followed by a Mass.

Economy 

At present, Magarao belongs to the third class municipality bracket although there are improvements being made by the local government to hasten its developmental stage. The town, through the initiative of its local officials, allows its constituents to engage into worthwhile activities by providing for them training and seminar workshops on various livelihood projects like ceramics training, papermaking, handicrafts and other community-based industries.

This was made possible due to the combined efforts made by the local government of Magarao and the provincial government of Camarines Sur through the Provincial Livelihood Training, Research and Development Program (PLTRD) The program is geared towards providing community-based industries, identifying projects for product development and skills training and also conducting seminar and workshops for the various livelihood projects.

The residents of Magarao has immersed themselves in opportunities which would not just serve benefits for them but would obviously boost their town's economic condition.

Infrastructure

Communications
Internet providers include Globe, Smart, TNT, PLDT in the town. Telephone company is BayanTel and other local telephone companies.

Power
Power and electricity is supplied by the Camarines Sur Electric Cooperative II (CASURECO II).

Roads
Most roads are paved. The main road is both paved and asphalted. Rural areas are mostly gravel or dirt roads
Calabanga-Naga road or Northbound road goes through town.

Transportation
Coastal barangays are served by bancas that ply from the wharf near Naga City to the barangays of Ponong, Barobaybay and Carigsa along the Bicol River and in the estuarine areas.

Water utility
Water is provided by Metro Naga Water District (MNWD).

Gallery

References

External links

 [ Philippine Standard Geographic Code]
Philippine Census Information
Official Site of the Province of Camarines Sur

Municipalities of Camarines Sur
Metro Naga